IKEA is a multinational group of companies that designs and sells ready-to-assemble furniture (such as beds, chairs and desks), appliances and home accessories. , there are 460 IKEA stores operating in 63 countries.

IKEA stores

Current markets
The following list of countries and regions with IKEA stores is arranged by the date of the first store in each market.

Future markets

Former markets

Franchises 
IKEA stores are operated by 12 companies under franchise agreements with Inter IKEA Systems B.V. Inter IKEA Systems B.V. also owns and operates a single store — the IKEA Delft store in the Netherlands.

Largest stores

The world's six largest IKEA stores are:

 Pasay, Metro Manila, Philippines 
 Gwangmyeong, Gyeonggi, South Korea: 
 Stockholm Kungens Kurva, Sweden: 
 Shanghai Baoshan, China: 
 Goyang, Gyeonggi, South Korea: 
 Bangyai, Nonthaburi, Thailand

References

External links
Inter IKEA B.V., World-wide IKEA store listing and map

IKEA stores
IKEA stores
IKEA stores